Phytoecia anatolica is a species of beetle in the family Cerambycidae. It was described by Ernst Fuchs and Stephan von Breuning in 1971. It is known from Turkey.

References

Phytoecia
Beetles described in 1971